Alkaly Mamadou Ndour (born 2 March 1997) is a Senegalese basketball player for AS Douanes and .

Professional career
Ndour started his professional career in 2012 when he started playing for ASCC Bopp in the Senegalse Nationale 1. In 2016, he transferred to AS Douanes. Since the 2017–18 season, he is the starting point guard for the team. In May 2021, he played with Douanes in the 2021 BAL season.

National team career
Alkaly plays for the Senegal national basketball team and after being in the pre-selection in 2018 and 2019, he made his debut in the AfroBasket 2021 qualifying rounds.

BAL career statistics

|-
| style="text-align:left;"|2021
| style="text-align:left;"|AS Douanes
| 4 || 4 || 17.2 || .353 || .200 || .500 || 2.8 || 4.3 || 1.3 || .0 || 3.8
|-
|- class="sortbottom"
| style="text-align:center;" colspan="2"|Career
| 4 || 4 || 17.2 || .353 || .200 || .500 || 2.8 || 4.3 || 1.3 || .0 || 3.8

References

External links
Afrobasket profile
Proballers profile

1997 births
Living people
Senegalese men's basketball players
Point guards
AS Douanes basketball players
ASCC Bopp players